Tingena terrena is a species of moth in the family Oecophoridae. It is endemic to New Zealand and has been observed in Otago. The adults of this species are on the wing in December.

Taxonomy 
This species was first described by Alfred Philpott using specimens collected on the lower slopes of Ben Lomond in Queenstown in December. Philpott originally named the species Borkhausenia terrena. In that publication Philpott also studied and illustrated the genitalia of the male of this species. George Hudson discussed this species in his 1928 book The butterflies and moths of New Zealand as a synonym of B. melanamma. In 1988 J. S. Dugdale placed this species in the genus Tingena. The male holotype specimen is held in the New Zealand Arthropod Collection.

Description 
Philpott described this species as follows:  

This species is very similar in appearance to T. melanamma but can be distinguished as it has no markings on its forewings and the contours of its forewings are also different.

Distribution
This species is endemic to New Zealand and has been observed in Otago.

Behaviour
Adults of this species are on the wing in December.

References

Oecophoridae
Moths of New Zealand
Moths described in 1926
Endemic fauna of New Zealand
Taxa named by Alfred Philpott
Endemic moths of New Zealand